Infernal Affairs is the debut album by the Danish dance act Infernal, released in 1998 in Denmark. It became an unexpected success, selling more than 80,000 copies (two-times platinum). The album was awarded Danish Upfront Dance Release of the Year at the 1999 Danish Grammy Awards.

Track listing

Charts and certifications

Album

Singles

References

External links 
Infernal Affairs at Discogs

Infernal (Danish band) albums
1998 debut albums